Humboldt Municipal Airport  is a city-owned public-use airport located one nautical mile (1.85 km) west of the central business district of Humboldt, a city in Humboldt County, Iowa, United States. According to the FAA's National Plan of Integrated Airport Systems for 2009–2013, it is classified as a general aviation airport.

Facilities and aircraft 
It has one runway designated 12/30 with an asphalt surface measuring 3,417 by 60 feet (1,042 x 18 m).

For the 12-month period ending July 25, 2008, the airport had 4,000 general aviation aircraft operations, an average of 10 per day. At that time there were 12 aircraft based at this airport, all single-engine.

References

External links 
 Humboldt Municipal Airport (0K7) at Iowa DOT Airport Directory
 Aerial photo as of 21 March 1990 from USGS The National Map

Airports in Iowa
Transportation buildings and structures in Humboldt County, Iowa
Humboldt, Iowa